Konstantin Mikhailovich Romanov (born March 14, 1985) is a Kazakhstani-Russian professional ice hockey winger who currently plays for Barys Astana of the Kontinental Hockey League (KHL).

Career
Romanov began his career with Dynamo Moscow in 2004, and had 5 points in his rookie season. He set modest career highs with 6 goals and 12 points in 2005-06, a year after winning the league championship with Dynamo. He was signed by Barys Astana in 2009, but has seen limited ice time with the club, and appeared in only 19 games during the 2009-10 season.

International
Romanov was named to the Kazakhstan men's national ice hockey team for competition at the 2014 IIHF World Championship.

References

External links

1985 births
Living people
Barys Nur-Sultan players
HC Dynamo Moscow players
Ice hockey people from Moscow
Kazakhstani ice hockey players
Russian ice hockey right wingers